The black-backed woodpecker (Picoides arcticus), also known as the Arctic three-toed woodpecker, is a medium-sized woodpecker ( long) inhabiting the forests of North America.

Taxonomy
The black-backed woodpecker was described and illustrated by the English naturalist William John Swainson in 1832 from a specimen collected near the source of the Athabasca River on the eastern slopes of the Rocky Mountains in Alberta, Canada. He coined the binomial name Picus arcticus. The specific epithet arcticus is the Latin word for "northern" or "arctic". The 
black-backed woodpecker is now placed in the genus Picoides was erected by the French naturalist Bernard Germain de Lacépède in 1799. The species is monotypic: no subspecies are recognised.

Description
The plumage of adults is black on the head, back, wings and rump. They are white from the throat to the belly; the flanks are white with black bars. Their tail is black with white outer feathers. There is an element of sexual dimorphism in the plumage, with the adult male possessing a yellow cap. Unlike all other woodpeckers except the related American and Eurasian three-toed woodpeckers, this species has three-toed feet.

Measurements:

 Length: 
 Weight: 
 Wingspan:

Habitat and breeding
Their breeding range is boreal forest across Canada, Alaska, the Northwestern United States, as well as northern Wisconsin, the Adirondacks in New York, New England, Minnesota, and Upper Michigan. In particular the species is a burnt-forest specialist, feeding on the outbreaks of wood-boring beetles that feed on recently burnt trees. The most important wood boring beetles taken are in the families Cerambycidae and Buprestidae, along with engraver beetles and the mountain pine beetle. Most food is obtained by pecking, a smaller proportion is obtained by gleaning off branches. Black-backed woodpeckers are generally non-migratory but historically have undertaken intermittent irruptions.

Nest excavation occurs in April and May; a fresh nest is drilled each year into the sapwood of dead trees. Abandoned nests are used by other species of bird to nest in. The female lays three or four eggs, and incubation duties are shared between both parents, although the male alone incubates during the night. Upon hatching the altricial chicks are brooded until the nestling phase. Both parents feed the chicks, which take about 24 days to fledge.

Vocalization
The call note of the black-backed woodpecker is a single, sharp pik, and is lower pitched than the call of the American three-toed woodpecker.

References

 Dixon, Rita D., and Victoria A. Saab. (2000). Black-backed woodpecker (Picoides arcticus), The Birds of North America Online (A. Poole, Ed.). Ithaca: Cornell Lab of Ornithology; Retrieved from the Birds of North America Online: http://bna.birds.cornell.edu/bna/species/509
 National Geographic's Field Guide to the Birds of North America, Third Edition; Describes call note

External links

Black-backed woodpecker - Picoides arcticus - USGS Patuxent Bird Identification InfoCenter
Black-backed Woodpecker Species Account - Cornell Lab of Ornithology
 
 

black-backed woodpecker
Birds of Canada
Native birds of the Northwestern United States
Native birds of Alaska
Birds of the Sierra Nevada (United States)
Fauna of the Great Lakes region (North America)
Least concern biota of North America
Black-backed woodpecker
black-backed woodpecker
Black-backed woodpecker